The 2022 Liga 2 season was the 77th edition of the second tier of Federación Peruana de Futbol. This year's edition started on 2 April 2022 and ended on 25 September 2022.

Teams

Torneo Apertura

Results

Torneo Clausura

Results

Aggregate table

Title playoff
As Cusco finished as champion of the Apertura and Clausura tournaments, no playoff games were played. Cusco were the overall champions and Unión Comercio were the overall runners-up

Promotion playoff

Unión Comercio won 4–2 on aggregate and were promoted to Liga 1. Ayacucho were relegated to Liga 2.

Top goalscorers

See also
 2022 Liga 1
 2022 Copa Bicentenario
 2022 Copa Perú
 2022 Torneo de Promoción y Reserva

References

External links
  
Peruvian Segunda División news at Peru.com 
Peruvian Segunda División statistics and news at Dechalaca.com 
Peruvian Segunda División news at SegundaPerú.com 
 RSSSF

2022
2022 in Peruvian football